The Journal of the American Chemical Society is a weekly peer-reviewed scientific journal that was established in 1879 by the American Chemical Society. The journal has absorbed two other publications in its history, the Journal of Analytical and Applied Chemistry (July 1893) and the American Chemical Journal (January 1914). It covers all fields of chemistry. Since 2021, the editor-in-chief is Erick M. Carreira (ETH Zurich). In 2014, the journal moved to a hybrid open access publishing model.

Abstracting and indexing
The journal is abstracted and indexed in Chemical Abstracts Service, Scopus, EBSCO databases, ProQuest databases, Index Medicus/MEDLINE/PubMed, and the Science Citation Index Expanded. According to the Journal Citation Reports, the journal has a 2021 impact factor of 16.383.

Editors-in-chief 
The following people are or have been editor-in-chief:
 1879–1880 – Hermann Endemann
 1880–1881 – Gideon E. Moore
 1881–1882 – Hermann Endemann
 1882–1883 – Editorial Committee
 1884–1892 – Abram A. Breneman
 1893–1901 – Edward Hart
 1902–1917 – William A. Noyes Sr.
 1918–1949 – Arthur Lamb 
 1950–1962 – W. Albert Noyes Jr.
 1963–1969 – Marshall D. Gates Jr.
 1969–1975 – Martin Stiles 
 1975–1981 – Cheves Walling
 1982–2001 – Allen J. Bard
 2002–2020 – Peter J. Stang
 since 2021 – Erick M. Carreira

References

External links

Chemistry journals
Publications established in 1879
Weekly journals
English-language journals
1879 establishments in the United States